Mahadeshwara Pooja Phala is a 1975 Indian Kannada-language film, directed by Sangram and produced by S. V. Rajendra Singh. The film stars Srinath, B. V. Radha, Ramadevi, T. N. Balakrishna and Rajasree in the lead roles. The film has musical score by Chellapilla Satyam.

Cast

Srinath
B. V. Radha
Ramadevi
T. N. Balakrishna
Ramgopal
Rajasree
Rajanand
Dwarakish
B. Jaya
Ambareesh
Sangram
Dikki Madhavarao
Master Honnappa Bhagavathar
C. D. Ramachandra
Maccheri
Ramaraje Urs
Kamalamma
Premakumari

Soundtrack
The music was composed by Satyam.

References

External links
 

1974 films
1970s Kannada-language films
Films scored by Satyam (composer)